Connacht–Ulster was a constituency of the European Parliament in Ireland between 1979 and 2004. Throughout its history, it elected 3 Members of the European Parliament (MEPs) using the single transferable vote (STV) system.

Although the constituency was abolished in 2004, Connacht-Ulster is still often used when analysing election results by region, as in this analysis of the results by region of the 2018 referendum to remove the constitutional prohibition of abortion.

History and boundaries
The constituency was created in 1979 for the first direct elections to the European Parliament. It comprised the counties of Galway, Leitrim, Mayo, Roscommon and Sligo from the historic province of Connacht together with the Ulster counties of Cavan, Donegal, and Monaghan. It was abolished under the European Parliament Elections (Amendment) Act 2004 and succeeded by the new North-West constituency.

MEPs

Elections

1999 election

Mark Killilea retired and his seat was gained by Independent Dana Rosemary Scallon.

1994 election

Pat "the Cope" Gallagher of Fianna Fáil gained the seat vacated by Neil Blaney.

1989 election

Neil Blaney regained his seat at the expense of Fianna Fáil.

1984 election

Neil Blaney lost his seat to Ray MacSharry of Fianna Fáil.

1979 election

See also
European Parliament constituencies in the Republic of Ireland

References

External links 
 European elections, European Parliament Liaison Office in Ireland

Connacht
European Parliament constituencies in the Republic of Ireland (historic)
1979 establishments in Ireland
2004 disestablishments in Ireland
Constituencies established in 1979
Constituencies disestablished in 2004